Alexander Park, or Alexander AEP Park, is a park in Columbus, Ohio, United States. Donated by American Electric Power, the park is located between Battelle Riverfront Park and North Bank Park. It is named after former City Council President Arvin J. Alexander, and features a 1991 memorial in his honor by Carl Faehnle. The park also features a plaque marking the site of the city's first cabin, completed by John Brickell in 1797.

See also

 List of parks in Columbus, Ohio

References

External links
 
 Scioto Mile page

American Electric Power
Downtown Columbus, Ohio
Parks in Columbus, Ohio